Vartdalsfjorden is a fjord (more technically, a strait) in Møre og Romsdal county, Norway. It begins at the Storfjorden and Sulafjorden in the northeast and flows through the municipalities of Hareid and Ulstein on the northern shore of the fjord and through the municipalities of Ørsta and Volda on the southern shore. The village of Vartdal lies on the southern shore of the fjord in Ørsta. From 1895 until 1964, the southern banks of the fjord were part of the municipality of Vartdal.

See also
 List of Norwegian fjords

References

Fjords of Møre og Romsdal
Ulstein
Ørsta
Volda
Hareid